Mirza Abdul Karim Roushan Tehrani was an Iranian philosopher on mysticism, law, and the Quran.

Authority
When aged 28, he received permission of Ejtehad from Sayyid Mar'ashi Najafi.

Character
As a philosopher, he stressed the relationship between wisdom, mysticism and the Quran. He often advised his pupils to practice self-reflection, contemplating divine love, and praying.

Teachers
His teachers included Jalal Addin Ashtiani described Ayatollah Roushan Tehrani as the Only Factual Pupil of Mirza Mahdi Ashtiani. Other notable instructors of Mirza were Sheykh Ali Lavasani, Sheykh Muhammad Lavasani, Aqa Zol MAjdayn, Mirza Mehdi Ashtiani, Mirza Taher Tonekaboni, Mirza Ebrahim Emam Zadeh Zeidi, Mirza Muhammad Ali Shah Abadi, Muhammad Taqi Amoli.

Sources
Interviews about Abdulkarim Roushan Tehrani, 2003, Keihan e Farhangi Magazine. number 203.

The history of Contemporary Men of Wisdom and Mistycs, Manouchehr Sadoughi Soha, Anjoman hekmat va Falsafeh publication.1979

External links

References

Muslim scholars of Islamic jurisprudence
1903 births
1992 deaths